Victor Kassir (1910–1997) was a Lebanese businessman and politician who was the deputy prime minister and minister of industry and economy between 1984 and 1988.

Early life and education
Kassir was born in Beirut in 1910. He descended from a Greek Orthodox family. He received a bachelor's degree in commercial sciences in 1930 from Saint Joseph University in Beirut.

Career
Following his graduation Kassir began to involve in business. In 1958 he was elected as a member of the Orthodox Finance Council. He headed the merchants association from 1972 to 1994. He was a member of the advisory committee of the Banque du Liban, a member of the Beirut Club, and a board member of the Banque Libano-Francaise. In fact, Kassir was one of the owners of the latter together with Farid Raphael and the Kassar brothers, Adnan and Nadim.

Kassir was the deputy prime minister and the minister of economy and industry in the cabinet led by Prime Minister Rashid Karami in the period 29 April 1984–22 September 1988.

Personal life and death
Kassir was married to Bert Merhej, and they had four children. He died on 13 October 1997.

Awards
Kassir was the recipient of the following: 

 National Order of the Cedar (rank of officer)
 Order of Merit (rank of commander)
 Order of Saint Peter the Great

References

20th-century Lebanese businesspeople
1910 births
1997 deaths
Businesspeople from Beirut
Economy and Trade ministers of Lebanon
Greek Orthodox Christians from Lebanon
Officers of the National Order of the Cedar
Recipients of the Order of Merit (Lebanon)
Deputy prime ministers of Lebanon
Saint Joseph University alumni